The following are the association football events of the year 1891 throughout the world.

Events
Royal Arsenal turn professional, renaming themselves Woolwich Arsenal in the process.

Clubs founded in 1891

Denmark
Vejle Boldklub

England
Harpenden Town F.C.
Redditch United F.C.

Greece
Panachaiki

Northern Ireland
Belfast Celtic F.C.

Scotland
Vale of Leithen F.C.

Sweden
 Allmänna Idrottsklubben
 Djurgårdens IF

Uruguay
C.A. Peñarol (as Central Uruguay Railway Cricket Club)

National Championship Winners

Argentina
Primera División Winners:
Saint Andrew's

Denmark
Football Tournament Winners:
Kjøbenhavns Boldklub

England
Football League Winners:
Everton
FA Cup Winners:
Blackburn Rovers

Ireland
Football League Winners:
Linfield
Irish Cup Winners:
Linfield

Netherlands
Football League Winners:
HVV Den Haag

Scotland
Football League Winners:
Dumbarton
Scottish Cup Winners:
Heart of Midlothian

Wales
Welsh Cup Winners:
Shrewsbury Town

International tournaments
1891 British Home Championship (28 March – 6 April 1891)
England

Births
 22 September – Charlie Buchan (d. 1960), England international forward in six matches (1913–1924), scoring four goals.
 15 December – David Wijnveldt (d. 1962), Netherlands international (1912).

Footnotes

 
Association football by year